United Nations Security Council Resolution 435, adopted on September 29, 1978, put forward proposals for a cease-fire and UN-supervised elections in South African-controlled South West Africa which ultimately led to the independence of Namibia. Importantly, it established the United Nations Transition Assistance Group (UNTAG) which oversaw the election and the South African withdrawal.

The resolution was adopted by 12 votes to none; Czechoslovakia and the Soviet Union abstained while the People's Republic of China did not participate in the vote.

On December 22, 1988, South Africa agreed to implement the resolution upon its signature of the Tripartite Accord at the United Nations in New York. The Accord concluded an agreement on independence for Namibia, and the withdrawal of Cuban troops from Angola, and was signed by Angola, Cuba and South Africa.

See also
 Angolan Civil War
 History of Namibia
 List of United Nations Security Council Resolutions 401 to 500 (1976–1982)
 South African Border War
 United Nations Commissioner for Namibia
 United Nations Security Council Resolution 264

References

External links
 
Text of the Resolution at undocs.org
 Reprint of "Namibian Voters Deny Total Power to SWAPO" by Michael Johns, The Wall Street Journal, November 19, 1989.

 0435
United Nations Security Council Resolution 435
United Nations Security Council Resolution 435
 0435
 0435
September 1978 events